Rim Chol-min (born 24 November 1990) is a North Korean football forward presently playing for April 25 in the DPR Korea Premier League, wearing number 13.

Career
Rim started his career with Sobaeksu in North Korea. In 2011 he joined FC Wil 1900 in Switzerland, but after failing to make the first team in his first two seasons, he was loaned out to SC Brühl for the 2012–13 season, where he scored two goals in eleven matches. In 2014 he returned to North Korea to play with April 25. In the 2016 edition of the Hwaebul Cup, Rim scored the only goal in a 1–0 victory over Sŏnbong to secure April 25's berth in the semi-finals. April 25 went on to win the Hwaebul Cup that year, with a 3–2 shootout win over Hwaebul.

References 

Living people
1990 births
North Korean footballers
North Korea international footballers
North Korean expatriate footballers
Expatriate footballers in Switzerland
North Korean expatriate sportspeople in Switzerland
FC Wil players
Association football forwards